Zameer: The Fire Within is a 2005 Bollywood romantic drama film starring Ajay Devgn, Amisha Patel and Mahima Chaudhry. The film was directed by Kamal and was remake of the Malayalam film Mazhayethum Munpe. It was delayed for almost 5 years. The film was a box office failure.

Plot 
The film begins in Kolkata. Suraj is leading a life of anonymity. But Dildar, a friend and confidant, convinces him to return.

The flashback begins: Suraj is a chemistry professor in a women's college. One of the students, Pooja, is a spoilt and bratty girl who believes in playing pranks in the classroom, including bursting crackers to 'welcome' the new professor.

Suraj's heart beats for Supriya, who has had an attack of paralysis. She is undergoing treatment in an ayurvedic hospital. In the meanwhile, Pooja continues to rag Suraj — at home, at college, even at Dildar's wedding anniversary.

The story takes a turn when Supriya's father informs Suraj that Supriya has started walking, without any kind of a support. Meanwhile, Pooja plays a cruel joke on Suraj, pretending to have brain tumor. This infuriates Suraj. But Pooja has fallen in love with him.

Pooja now openly professes love for Suraj. To clear any kind of a confusion, Suraj introduces Supriya as his 'love and life' to Pooja and her friends. Pooja takes it as an insult and considers Suraj a sadist. Pooja decides to quit college and blames Supriya for it. Pooja confronts Supriya, lying to her that Suraj merely sympathizes with her since she is unwell.

On her father's insistence, Pooja rejoins her college. There, she learns that Supriya has been hospitalized since she has suffered a mental shock. At this stage, Supriya decides to break off her engagement with Suraj and requests him to marry Pooja.

Supriya's father also wants them to marry, since that's what Supriya desires. After a bit of hesitation, Suraj marries Pooja. But post-marriage, the guilt of having wronged Supriya drives Pooja to depression.

Pooja admits her selfish attitude to Supriya; at this point Supriya's father bursts out and spits venom on Pooja. Suraj walks in at this juncture and gets to know the truth and he walks out on Pooja.

Five years later, Suraj learns that Pooja had committed suicide. But before killing herself, Pooja had given birth to a baby girl who is now being mothered by Supriya, who has fully recovered. Suraj forgives Pooja and unites with Supriya and his daughter, who was also named Pooja by Supriya.

Cast

Soundtrack
The tune "Endinu Veroru" from the original Malayalam film was modified here as "Di Ye Dua".

References

External links 
 

2000s Hindi-language films
2005 films
Films scored by Jatin–Lalit
Indian romantic drama films
2005 romantic drama films
Hindi remakes of Malayalam films
Films set in Kolkata
Films shot in Daman and Diu
Films scored by Nikhil-Vinay
Films directed by Kamal (director)